Look Out Below is a 1919 American short comedy film starring Harold Lloyd. Prints of this film survive.

Cast
 Harold Lloyd - The Boy
 Bebe Daniels - The Girl
 Snub Pollard - Snub
 Sammy Brooks
 Billy Fay
 Lew Harvey
 Bud Jamison
 Margaret Joslin
 Oscar Larson
 Marie Mosquini
 William Petterson
 Noah Young

See also
 Harold Lloyd filmography

External links

References

1919 films
1919 comedy films
Silent American comedy films
American black-and-white films
1919 short films
American silent short films
Films directed by Hal Roach
American comedy short films
1910s American films